Jockgrim is a Verbandsgemeinde ("collective municipality") in the district of Germersheim, Rhineland-Palatinate, Germany. The seat of the Verbandsgemeinde is in Jockgrim.

The Verbandsgemeinde Jockgrim consists of the following Ortsgemeinden ("local municipalities"):

 Hatzenbühl
 Jockgrim
 Neupotz
 Rheinzabern

Verbandsgemeinde in Rhineland-Palatinate